The Simputer General Public License, or the SGPL is a hardware distribution public copyright license drafted specifically for the purpose of distributing Simputers. As a license it has been loosely modeled on the GPL but in substance it is very different.

The Simputer specifications are released under the terms and conditions of the SGPL. This license permits the user to build a Simputer based upon the specifications and to use the Simputer for non-commercial purposes. Any modifications made to the Simputer specifications may be used exclusively by the person making those modifications with no obligation to release the same to the public domain. However, within 12 months from the date of the first public sale of the Simputer based on these modified specifications, the person who created these modified specifications is bound to disclose the specifications to the Simputer Trust.

The Simputers manufactured under the SGPL are required to be certified by the Simputer Trust before they are allowed to be sold under the Simputer trademark. In order to be so certified they must fulfill the Core Simputer Specifications as disclosed on the simputer website.

All Simputers developed under the specifications must be distributed under the same terms as the SGPL.

External links
Simputer(TM): License: SGPL V1.3

Open hardware licenses
Public copyright licenses